David Davis Farm, also known as the Christian Summers Farm and John Martin Farm, is a historic farm and national historic district located at Earl Township, Lancaster County, Pennsylvania. The district includes seven contributing buildings and one contributing site.  They include the farmhouse, a stone bank barn (c. 1780), spring house (c. 1800), two frame tobacco barns, a small frame shed (c. 1940), and family burial ground.  The farmhouse is an evolutionary dwelling originally built as a two-story, stone building about 1750, and extensively remodeled in 1787.  Stone and frame additions were made about 1815, about 1870, and about 1890.  Attached to the house is a small frame summer kitchen with beehive oven, that was once a separate structure.

It was listed on the National Register of Historic Places in 1994.

References

Farms on the National Register of Historic Places in Pennsylvania
Historic districts on the National Register of Historic Places in Pennsylvania
Houses in Lancaster County, Pennsylvania
National Register of Historic Places in Lancaster County, Pennsylvania